The Forest Grove City Library serves Forest Grove, Oregon, and is part of the Washington County Cooperative Library Services.

History
Established in 1908, the library was the first public library in Washington County.  Supported by a tax levy from the beginning, the library became a city department in 1974.  Since the late 1970s, the library has been located in the Municipal Services Building; its space was enlarged in the late 1990s.

References

External links

1908 establishments in Oregon
Buildings and structures in Forest Grove, Oregon
Libraries established in 1908
Washington County Cooperative Library Services